Steigen Sportsklubb is a Norwegian sports club from Steigen, Nordland. It has sections for association football, team handball, floorball, orienteering, archery and Nordic skiing.

The men's football team currently plays in the Fourth Division, the fifth tier of Norwegian football, after being relegated from the Third Division in 2010. It last played in the Second Division in 2006. After the 2002 season it contested a playoff to win promotion, but failed (it did succeed after the 2005 season, but was relegated straight back).

Recent history
{|class="wikitable"
|-bgcolor="#efefef"
! Season
!
! Pos.
! Pl.
! W
! D
! L
! GS
! GA
! P
!Cup
!Notes
|-
|2005
|D2
|align=right bgcolor=gold|13
|align=right|20||align=right|16||align=right|1||align=right|3
|align=right|97||align=right|35||align=right|49
|
|Promoted to 2. Division
|-
|2006
|D2
|align=right bgcolor=red|14
|align=right|22||align=right|3||align=right|2||align=right|21
|align=right|33||align=right|89||align=right|11
|1st round
|Relegated to 3. Division
|-
|2007
|D3
|align=right bgcolor=silver|2
|align=right|22||align=right|15||align=right|2||align=right|5
|align=right|67||align=right|34||align=right|47
|
|Promoted to 2. Division
|-
|2008
|D3
|align=right bgcolor=cc9966|3
|align=right|22||align=right|14||align=right|4||align=right|4
|align=right|76||align=right|37||align=right|46
|1st qualifying round 
|
|-
|2009
|D3
|align=right bgcolor=cc9966|3
|align=right|20||align=right|12||align=right|4||align=right|4
|align=right|59||align=right|43||align=right|40
|1st qualifying round 	
|
|-
|2010
|D3
|align=right bgcolor=red|7
|align=right|22||align=right|6||align=right|6||align=right|10
|align=right|41||align=right|63||align=right|24
|2nd qualifying round 
|Relegated to 4. Division
|-
|2011 
|D4
|align=right bgcolor=silver|2
|align=right|18||align=right|14||align=right|1||align=right|3
|align=right|66||align=right|30||align=right|43
|
|
|-
|2012
|D4
|align=right bgcolor=gold|1
|align=right|18||align=right|16||align=right|1||align=right|1
|align=right|85||align=right|22||align=right|49
|
|Promoted to 3. Division
|-
|2013 
|D3
|align=right |9
|align=right|22||align=right|7||align=right|3||align=right|12
|align=right|54||align=right|66||align=right|24
|1st qualifying round 
|
|}

References

Football clubs in Norway
Sport in Nordland
Association football clubs established in 1947
1947 establishments in Norway